Carolyn Treacy Bramante (born March 19, 1982) is an athlete from Duluth, Minnesota, USA. She was a member of the U.S. 2006 Winter Olympics biathlon team. She attended Dartmouth College where she earned her undergraduate degree in sociology.

2006 Winter Olympics results
In February 2006, Bramante competed in the 2006 Winter Olympics in Turin, Italy. Individually, she placed 80th in the Women's 7.5 km Sprint finals, with a time of 28:18:4. She was a member of the U.S. Women's 4x6 km Relay team, which placed 15th with a time of 1 hour, 25.20.3 minutes.  She anchored the team to their best finish ever.,

Medical school
Bramante is a graduate of the University of Minnesota Medical School. She founded Interprofessional Street Outreach Program to bring health care to underserved populations around the Twin Cities (Minneapolis–Saint Paul).

She completed a combined residency in internal medicine and pediatrics at the Johns Hopkins Hospital. She currently is an assistant professor at the University of Minnesota, where she is triple board certified in internal medicine, pediatrics, and obesity medicine.

Family
She is married to Anthony Bramante, they met in college at Dartmouth.

References

External links 
 NBC Olympics
 Kokesh, Jerry. "BIATHLON - Carolyn Treacy Takes Trials' Final Competition", U.S. Biathlon Association, January 2, 2003.
 US Biathlon Team profile for Bramante
 Carolyn Treacy, United States Olympic Committee
 

American female biathletes
Olympic biathletes of the United States
Dartmouth College alumni
1982 births
Living people
Biathletes at the 2006 Winter Olympics
Sportspeople from Saint Paul, Minnesota
21st-century American women
Sportspeople from Duluth, Minnesota